Onocleopsis is a genus of ferns in the family Onocleaceae containing only one extant species, Onocleopsis hintonii.

References

External links

Polypodiales
Monotypic fern genera